"You Might Need Somebody" is a song written by Tom Snow and Nan O'Byrne, and first recorded in 1980 by American singer and guitarist Turley Richards. The following year, American jazz and R&B singer Randy Crawford released her version which charted well in the United Kingdom and was a modest hit in Flanders (Belgium) and New Zealand. In 1997, English singer Shola Ama's version charted well throughout Europe and New Zealand.

Early versions
In 1980, a version by American singer and guitarist Turley Richards peaked number 54 in the Billboard Hot 100. In the same year, Anna Oxa released an Italian version "Metropolitana" with Italian lyrics written by Marco Luberti for her studio album "Controllo totale".

In 1981, Randy Crawford covered the song for her album Secret Combination. It was the second single released from the album. Her version reached number eleven on the UK Singles Chart, making it her fourth highest-charting single on that chart. The version also peaked number 39 in the Flanders region of Belgian Ultratop 50 Singles chart in 1981 and in the New Zealand music chart one year later.

In 1991, Joe Walsh released his rock version of "You Might Need Somebody" on his ninth studio album Ordinary Average Guy.

Charts

Shola Ama version

In 1997, English singer Shola Ama recorded a version of the song featured on her debut album, Much Love (1997). Her version reached number four on the UK Singles Chart and became a top-10 hit also in France, Ireland, Israel, the Netherlands, and New Zealand. It was additionally a top-20 hit in Iceland, Scotland, and Switzerland. On the Eurochart Hot 100, it peaked at number 25 in October 1997. The accompanying music video was put at heavy rotation on MTV.

Critical reception
Larry Flick from Billboard described the song as a "curious little number" and a "jazzy, Brand New Heavies-ish type of track that reeks of a classic soul production akin to a Ray Parker Jr. orchestration". He added that "while that sounds confusing, once programmers and listeners key into the lyrics, which are well written and well executed, Shola Ama's influences are of no consequence". Swedish newspaper Göteborgs-Tidningen declared it as a "truly delightful, generous electric piano-garnished Randy Crawford-cover". A reviewer from Music & Media said that "there's little doubt that that Shola Ama has a fantastic voice", noting that "radio has already warmed to this familiar cover, which is reproduced almost note for note from the Randy Crawford original". 

British magazine Music Week rated it four out of five, adding that the singer "breathes new life" into the 16-year-old hit, "with a classy, understated performance." Editor Alan Jones said it is "still sounding superb", stating that "the backing is looser and less urgent, as the song ploughs an R&B furrow." Ralph Tee from he magazine's RM Dance Update rated it three out of five, noting that it is "given a crisp clean street soul production by D-Influence". He concluded that "its definitely their mix that cuts it the best, despite it sounding so close to the original. It just sounds great." Dave Fawbert from ShortList deemed the song as "absolutely massive". A reviewer from Sunday Mirror stated that Ama's "got such an amazing voice. She's the best British female R&B singer," and added, "I really liked 'You Might Need Somebody'".

Live performances
Ama performed "You Might Need Somebody" in three successive Top of the Pops performances. She told in an interview, "After the first couple of shows, people wouldn't believe that I had sung live; they all thought I'd been miming. So on the third one, I missed a bit out to prove it was for real."

Track listings

Charts and certifications

Weekly charts

Year-end charts

Certifications

References

1980 songs
1980 singles
1981 singles
1997 singles
Shola Ama songs
Contemporary R&B ballads
Songs written by Tom Snow
Warner Music Group singles
Randy Crawford songs